The UK Singles Chart is a record chart compiled on behalf of the British record industry. Since 1997, the chart has been compiled by the Official Charts Company (formerly The Official UK Charts Company and the Chart Information Network) and until 2005 (when digital downloads were included in the chart compilation), the chart was based entirely on sales of physical singles from retail outlets. The UK Singles Chart originated in 1952, when New Musical Express (NME) published the first chart of singles sales. The positions of all songs are based on week-end sale totals, from Sunday to Saturday, but pre-1987 the charts were released on a Tuesday because of the need for manual calculation.

Since inception there have been more than 1,400 number ones; of these, instrumental tracks have topped the chart on 30 occasions for a total of 96 weeks. The Shadows have had the most instrumental number ones, with five between 1960 and 1963. Three other artists have had more than one instrumental number one: Eddie Calvert (in 1954 and 1955), Winifred Atwell (in 1954 and 1956) and Russ Conway (both in 1959). Calvert's track "O Mein Papa" stayed at the top of the charts for nine weeks, longer than any other instrumental single. The single "Cherry Pink (and Apple Blossom White)" has been an instrumental number one for two different artists (Calvert and Perez Prado) in 1955. To date, Martin Garrix is the most recent artist to have an instrumental number one, with "Animals" in November 2013.

Number ones

References

External links
Instrumentals at Number One

Instrumental
Instrumentals